Kingston Airport may refer:

Kingston Airport (Nevada) in Kingston, Nevada, United States
Kingston Norman Rogers Airport in Kingston, Ontario, Canada
Kingston-Ulster Airport in Kingston, New York, United States
Norman Manley International Airport in Kingston, Jamaica